Foetidia is a genus of flowering plants first described as a genus in 1788. Most authors place the genus in the family Lecythidaceae, the sole genus in the subfamily Foetidioideae, but some prefer to treat it as a distinct family, the Foetidiaceae. It is native to eastern Africa and to various islands in the Indian Ocean.

Species

The wood of Foetidia mauritiana is one of several woods known as stinkwood because of its unpleasant smell.

References

Lecythidaceae
Ericales genera
Taxa named by Philibert Commerson